The Ligue 2 season 2006/2007, organised by the LFP was won by FC Metz and saw the promotions of FC Metz, SM Caen and RC Strasbourg, whereas FC Nantes Atlantique, CS Sedan Ardennes and Troyes AC were relegated from Ligue 1.

20 participating teams

 Ajaccio
 Amiens
 Bastia
 Brest
 Caen
 Châteauroux
 Créteil
 Dijon
 Grenoble
 Gueugnon
 Guingamp
 Istres
 Le Havre
 Libourne
 Metz
 Montpellier
 Niort
 Reims
 Strasbourg
 Tours

League table

Results

Top goalscorers

Attendance 

Against Team hosted for the best attendance

External links
RSSSF archives of results
Official attendance on LFP site

Ligue 2 seasons
French
2006–07 in French football